Kobina Badu Essel-Mensah (born 14 September 1944) is a Ghanaian footballer. He competed in the men's tournament at the 1972 Summer Olympics.

References

1944 births
Living people
Ghanaian footballers
Ghana international footballers
Olympic footballers of Ghana
Footballers at the 1972 Summer Olympics
Place of birth missing (living people)
Association football goalkeepers